Ion Moina Stadium was a multi-use stadium in Cluj-Napoca, Romania.  It was used mostly for football matches and is the home ground of U Cluj. The stadium held 28,000 people and was inaugurated in 1911.

The first football and athletics stadium in Cluj-Napoca was built between 1908 and 1911. It had wooden stands and had a capacity of 1,500 people. The official inauguration in 1911 was done by organizing a game between a Cluj XI and Galatasaray Istanbul. It was the first game in Europe for Galatasaray, and Cluj won 8–1.

In 1961, new stands were built and the capacity of the stadium became 28,000 on wooden benches, while the old stands were moved to Câmpia Turzii. The 1961 stands have a U-shaped appearance, as the name of the team that uses it ("U" Cluj). The stadium is named after Ion Moina, the fastest sprinter in Europe in 1948.
American R&B star Beyoncé performed for the first time in the country in this stadium on October 22, 2007, during The Beyoncé Experience tour.

On November 20, 2008, the demolition process began, and was planned to be finished in spring 2009. On November 22, 2008, the last official football match played in this stadium, Mureşul Deva, finished 0–0.

The construction of the new stadium, Cluj Arena, began in summer 2009 and finished in 2011. It was inaugurated in 11 October 2011 with a friendly match of Universitatea Cluj against Kuban Krasnodar. The new stadium construction was completed in 2012.

References

Buildings and structures in Cluj-Napoca
Demolished buildings and structures in Romania
Defunct football venues in Romania
Defunct athletics (track and field) venues
FC Universitatea Cluj
Sports venues in Cluj-Napoca